Nguyễn Hải Dương (born in Phong Điền District in Thừa Thiên–Huế Province on 15 April 1943) pen name and political name Nguyễn Khoa Điềm is a Vietnamese poet and government literary official.

His work is included in the book, Six Vietnamese Poets.

References

1943 births
Living people
Vietnamese male poets
20th-century Vietnamese poets
20th-century male writers
Members of the 9th Politburo of the Communist Party of Vietnam
Members of the 9th Secretariat of the Communist Party of Vietnam
Members of the 8th Central Committee of the Communist Party of Vietnam
Members of the 9th Central Committee of the Communist Party of Vietnam